The 2008–09 3. Liga was the inaugural season for the newly formed tier III of the German football league system. The inaugural game was played on 25 July 2008 between FC Rot-Weiß Erfurt and Dynamo Dresden, ending with a 1–0 win for Dresden. The last games were played on 23 May 2009. 1. FC Union Berlin were the inaugural champions, securing first place on 10 May 2009. Runners-up Fortuna Düsseldorf were also promoted. Third-placed team SC Paderborn 07 played a relegation/promotion play-off against the 16th-placed team from 2. Bundesliga, VfL Osnabrück, winning both games and earning promotion. Kickers Emden, VfR Aalen, and Stuttgarter Kickers were relegated to the Regionalliga.

Qualified teams

The following teams were relegated to 3. Liga from 2007–08 2. Bundesliga:
 Kickers Offenbach
 FC Erzgebirge Aue
 SC Paderborn 07
 FC Carl Zeiss Jena

The following teams qualified through Regionalliga North:
 Fortuna Düsseldorf
 1. FC Union Berlin
 SV Werder Bremen II
 Wuppertaler SV Borussia
 FC Rot-Weiß Erfurt
 Dynamo Dresden
 Kickers Emden
 Eintracht Braunschweig

The following teams qualified through Regionalliga South:
 VfB Stuttgart II
 VfR Aalen
 SV Sandhausen
 SpVgg Unterhaching
 SV Wacker Burghausen
 FC Bayern Munich II
 SSV Jahn Regensburg
 Stuttgarter Kickers

Teams, Head Coach, Cities and  Stadiums

Notes
 1. FC Union Berlin played its 2008–09 home matches at Friedrich-Ludwig-Jahn-Sportpark because their own ground Alte Försterei was undergoing renovation.

Managerial changes

League table

Results

Top scorers
Source: www.kicker.de
21 goals
  Anton Fink (SpVgg Unterhaching)17 goals
  Sercan Güvenisik (SC Paderborn 07)  Torsten Oehrl (SV Werder Bremen II)16 goals
  Karim Benyamina (1. FC Union Berlin)15 goals
  Thomas Müller (FC Bayern Munich II)14 goals
  Frank Löning (SC Paderborn 07)  Halil Savran (Dynamo Dresden)12 goals
  Massimo Cannizzaro (FC Rot-Weiß Erfurt)  Marco Sailer (VfR Aalen)''

References

External links
 3. Liga at the official German FA website 

3. Liga seasons
3
German